Squalidus japonicus is a species of cyprinid fish found in Japan and the Korean peninsula.

References

Squalidus
Taxa named by Henri Émile Sauvage
Fish described in 1883